El Espavé is a town in the Panamá province of Panama.

Sources 
World Gazeteer: Panama – World-Gazetteer.com

Populated places in Panamá Province